In enzymology, a dioxotetrahydropyrimidine phosphoribosyltransferase is an enzyme that catalyzes the chemical reaction

a 2,4-dioxotetrahydropyrimidine D-ribonucleotide + diphosphate  a 2,4-dioxotetrahydropyrimidine + 5-phospho-alpha-D-ribose 1-diphosphate

Thus, the two substrates of this enzyme are 2,4-dioxotetrahydropyrimidine D-ribonucleotide and diphosphate, whereas its two products are 2,4-dioxotetrahydropyrimidine and 5-phospho-alpha-D-ribose 1-diphosphate.

This enzyme belongs to the family of glycosyltransferases, specifically the pentosyltransferases.  The systematic name of this enzyme class is 2,4-dioxotetrahydropyrimidine-nucleotide:diphosphate phospho-alpha-D-ribosyltransferase. Other names in common use include dioxotetrahydropyrimidine-ribonucleotide pyrophosphorylase, dioxotetrahydropyrimidine phosphoribosyl transferase, and dioxotetrahydropyrimidine ribonucleotide pyrophosphorylase.

References

 

EC 2.4.2
Enzymes of unknown structure